Paul Burkhard (21 December 1911, Zürich – 6 September 1977, Zell) was a Swiss composer. He primarily wrote oratorios, musicals and operettas. The contemporaneous and similarly named Swiss composer Willy Burkhard was no relation to him.

Probably his most famous artistic creation was the song "" ("Oh! My Pa-Pa") about the death of a beloved clown-father, written for the musical  (re-issued in 1950 as ) that premiered in April 1939. The song rose to #1 on the Sheet Music Chart and stayed in the chart for 26 weeks. The song has been performed and recorded by numerous artists since then, including Alan Breeze, Billy Cotton, Billy Vaughn, Connie Francis, Diana Decker, Eddie Calvert, Eddie Fisher, The Everly Brothers, Harry James, Lys Assia, Ray Anthony & his Orchestra, Russ Morgan & his Orchestra, and many others.

Works (selection)
 1935: 
 1950: Das Feuerwerk (Original: Der schwarze Hecht, 1939) with the hit song O mein Papa
 1951: 
 1960:  – Comedy with Music; Oper einer Privatbank, by Friedrich Dürrenmatt
 1960:  – Christmas play
 1965: Noah – The story of Noah and the Arc – for children
 1971: Zäller Oschtere – Passion play

References

External links

O mein Papa – Documentary film about Paul Burkhard, September 2007
List of stage works

1911 births
1977 deaths
Swiss classical composers
20th-century classical composers
Swiss opera composers
Male opera composers
Musicians from Zürich
Swiss male classical composers
20th-century male musicians
20th-century Swiss composers